Sophia Henriette of Waldeck (3 August 1662, Arolsen – 15 October 1702, Erbach) was a Princess of Waldeck by birth and by marriage Duchess of Saxe-Hildburghausen,

Life 
Sophie Henriette was the daughter of Field Marshal Prince Georg Friedrich of Waldeck and his wife Countess Elisabeth Charlotte of Nassau-Siegen (1626–1694).

She married on 30 November 1680 in Arolsen with Duke Ernest of Saxe-Hildburghausen, a friend and comrade of her father, with whom she lived in Arolsen until 1683.  After the completion of the Castle in Hildburghausen, the couple moved there.  Sophie Henriette had a very close relationship with her eldest son Ernest Frederick I; she arranged his marriage to her first cousin once removed Countess Sophia Albertine of Erbach-Erbach.

Sophie Henriette died in 1702, ten days after her youngest son was born, before the wedding of Ernest Frederick and Sophia Albertine.  She was the first person to be buried in the Royal Crypt in the Palace Church in Hildburghausen.

Sophia Henriette's father died in 1692 leaving no male heirs.  Waldeck-Eisenberg fell to the Waldeck-Wildungen line; the
Lordship of Culemborg in the Netherlands was inherited by Sophia Henriette's older sister Louisa Anna (by marriage Countess of Erbach-Fürstenau), and after Louise's death in 1714 without surviving issue, by Sophia Henriette's son Ernest Frederick I, who sold it to the Dutch province of Gelderland in 1748.

Issue 
 Ernst Frederick I, Duke of Saxe-Hildburghausen (b. Gotha, 21 August 1681 – d. Hildburghausen, 9 March 1724).
 Sophie Charlotte (b. Arolsen, 23 December 1682 – d. Eisfeld, 20 April 1684).
 Sophie Charlotte (b. Hildburghausen, 23 March 1685 – d. Hildburghausen, 4 June 1710).
 Karl Wilhelm (b. Arolsen, 25 July 1686 – d. Arolsen, 2 April 1687).
 Joseph Maria Frederick Wilhelm (b. Erbach, 5 October 1702 – d. Hildburghausen, 4 January 1787).

References 
 Heinrich Ferdinand Schoeppl: Die Herzoge von Sachsen-Altenburg, Bolzano, 1917, repreinted: Altenburg, 1992
 Dr. Rudolf Armin Human: Chronik der Stadt Hildburghausen, Hildburghausen, 1886

|-

House of Waldeck
House of Saxe-Hildburghausen
1662 births
1702 deaths
German countesses
17th-century German people
German duchesses
German princesses
Daughters of monarchs